Schedocercops is a genus of moths in the family Gracillariidae.

Species
Schedocercops maeruae Vári, 1961

External links
Global Taxonomic Database of Gracillariidae (Lepidoptera)

Acrocercopinae
Gracillarioidea genera